99 Ways to Die is the fourth studio album by Master P. It was released on June 6, 1995, by No Limit Records and Priority Records.

Track listing

Chart positions

References

Category:Albums certified platinum by the Recording Industry Association of America

Master P albums
1995 albums
No Limit Records albums